Dragoljub is a Serbian masculine given name, derived from Slavic drag- ("dear, beloved") and ljub ("love, to like"), both very common in Slavic dithematic names. It roughly means "dear love". It may refer to:

Dragoljub Brnović, Montenegrin footballer
Dragoljub Čirić, Serbian chess player
Dragoljub Janošević, Serbian chess player
Dragoljub Jeremić, footballer
Dragoljub Ljubičić, Serbian actor
Dragoljub Mićunović, Serbian politician
Dragoljub Mihailović, Chetnik leader
Dragoljub Milošević, football player and coach
Dragoljub Minić, Montenegrin chess player
Dragoljub Ojdanić, Serbian civil servant
Dragoljub Popović, judge
Dragoljub Simonović, Serbian footballer
Dragoljub Velimirović, Serbian chess player
Dragoljub Vidačić, basketball player and coach

See also
Dragomir
Slavic names

References

Slavic masculine given names
Serbian masculine given names
Slovene masculine given names
Croatian masculine given names
Macedonian masculine given names

Ukrainian masculine given names
Bulgarian masculine given names